The 1995 Colorado Buffaloes football team represented the University of Colorado at Boulder in the 1995 NCAA Division I-A football season. The Buffaloes offense scored 444 points while the defense allowed 240 points. Led by head coach Rick Neuheisel, the Buffaloes competed in the Cotton Bowl Classic.

Schedule

Roster

Rankings

Game summaries

at Wisconsin

Colorado State

Northeast Louisiana

Texas A&M

at Oklahoma

Kansas

at Iowa State

Nebraska

at Oklahoma State

Missouri

at Kansas State

vs. Oregon (Cotton Bowl)

Team players drafted into the NFL

References

Colorado
Colorado Buffaloes football seasons
Cotton Bowl Classic champion seasons
Colorado Buffaloes football